Roses from the South (German: Rosen aus dem Süden) is a 1926 German silent romance film directed by Carl Froelich and starring Henny Porten, Angelo Ferrari and Wilhelm Bendow. Its title is a reference to the song Rosen aus dem Süden by Johann Strauss II. Art direction was by Franz Schroedter. The film premiered in Berlin on 11 March 1926.

Cast
 Henny Porten as Dr. Eva Maron
 Angelo Ferrari as Dr. Hans Adam
 Wilhelm Bendow as Adolf Brinkmann
  as Anna Kruse
 Robert Scholz as Armand Laurence
  as Die liebe Familie
 Sophie Pagay as Die liebe Familie
 Georg Baselt as Die liebe Familie
 Ernst Behmer as Die liebe Familie

References

Bibliography
 Grange, William. Cultural Chronicle of the Weimar Republic. Scarecrow Press, 2008.

External links

1926 films
1920s romance films
Films of the Weimar Republic
German silent feature films
German romance films
Films directed by Carl Froelich
German black-and-white films
1920s German films